Niégo is a department or commune of Ioba Province in south-eastern Burkina Faso. Its capital lies at the town of Niego.

Towns and villages
Niego

References

Departments of Burkina Faso
Ioba Province